The Rally Hokkaido (ラリー北海道), is an international rally racing event held on the island of Hokkaidō in Japan.

The rally was first held in 2002 as Japan's entry into the Asia-Pacific Rally Championship and Japan's return to international rallying.

In 2004 the rally was promoted to World Championship status as the inaugural Rally Japan. The following year the World and Asia-Pacific rallies were split into separate rallies with both still being held in Hokkaido with Rally Japan as the WRC round, Rally Hokkaido as the APRC round. It has been throughout a Japan Rally Championship event as well.

The event has been dominated by Subaru Imprezas with only one win taken by any other manufacturer. Local driver Toshihiro Arai has won his home event six times.

List of winners
Sourced in part from:

References

External links
Official website
Asia Pacific Championship

Rally competitions in Japan
Hokkaido